Bill Gray's is a chain of restaurants based in Webster, New York (a suburb of Rochester, New York) that currently has 14 restaurants in the Rochester area in western New York, including seven tap room-style restaurants, and one tavern-style grill named Flaherty's. Ten of these locations also sell Abbott's Frozen Custard.

History
In 1938, Bill and Alberta Gray began selling hot dogs in Webster.  Within a few years, Bill Gray's expanded and added multiple items to its menu.

Local businessman Bruce Hegedorn became a partner with Bill Gray in the early 1960s. With Bill as the head of operations and store management and Bruce as the financial person and location expert, they continued to expand and build the restaurant chain. They acquired competitor Tom Wahl's in 1986.

Restaurants
Bill Gray's mostly operates stand-alone restaurants in Monroe County, New York and Erie County, New York. Exceptions are the facility in the Strong National Museum of Play (Bill Gray's at the Skyliner), and the combined restaurant and sports bar in Bill Gray's Regional Iceplex.

References

External links
Official website
http://rocwiki.org/Bill_Gray's

Companies based in Monroe County, New York
Western New York
Fast-food chains of the United States
Regional restaurant chains in the United States
Restaurants established in 1938
1938 establishments in New York (state)